George J. Jetson is a fictional character from the animated television series The Jetsons. He is the patriarch of the Jetson family. He is the husband of Jane Jetson and the father of teenage daughter Judy and son Elroy.

Fictional character biography
George resides with his family and his dog Astro in the Skypad Apartments in Orbit City, in a future with the trappings of science fantasy depictions of American life in the future, such as robot servants, flying saucer-like cars, and moving sidewalks. All the apartment buildings are set on giant poles, resembling Seattle's Space Needle; the ground is almost never seen. In Jetsons: The Movie, it is revealed that they live in the sky due to excess of smog.

When George was a child, he had to fly through ten miles of asteroid storms to go to Orbit High School, where he was the star pitcher of its Spaceball team. George is now an employee at Spacely's Space Sprockets, a manufacturer of "sprockets" and other high tech equipment. His job title is a "digital index operator." His boss is Cosmo G. Spacely, noted for being short in both height and temper; Spacely usually treats his employees (particularly George) in a rather tyrannical fashion. George's job primarily requires him to repeatedly push a single button (or on occasion a series of buttons) on a computer (named RUDI {Short for: Referential Universal Digital Indexer} in the 1980s series of Jetsons episodes). George complains of his heavy work load: pushing a button on and off as many as five times for three hours, three days a week. Often, Mr. Spacely will fire George in a fit of anger, only to hire him back by the end of the same episode.

Physically, George is a rather slim man of average height with short red hair and a cartoonishly large nose. His personality is that of a well-meaning, caring father, but he is often befuddled and stressed out by the problems of both his work and family lives. As with most Hanna-Barbera productions of the 1950s and early 1960s, George Jetson was modeled after a contemporary celebrity; in George's case, it was character actor George O'Hanlon, who also voiced (and granted his name to) the character. O'Hanlon was well known for his roles as a common everyman (his best-known role outside of The Jetsons was the Joe McDoakes film series) and once said of his character: "George Jetson is an average man. He has trouble with his boss, he has problems with his kids, and so on. The only difference is that he lives in the next century."

Date of Birth
In the 2020s, fans, factcheckers and journalists debated the character's birthdate.  In July 2022, the character resurfaced on social media when fans claimed that George's birthday was July 31, 2022. Despite the claim, no official evidence has been found confirming this or any other specific date, although there is some evidence from the show that the year of his birth is 2022.

Catchphrase
George's most famous catchphrase is "Jane! Stop this crazy thing!" seen at the end credits of the 1960s Jetsons episodes, but is also known for frequently uttering the phrase "Hooba-dooba-dooba!" or "Hooba-Dooba" (in most episodes) to express wonder or astonishment (possibly inspired by Fred Flintstone's phrase "Yabba-dabba-doo!").

Portrayer

Morey Amsterdam was originally hired to voice the character but was fired due to sponsor conflicts between his numerous other projects, including The Dick Van Dyke Show. Amsterdam sued Hanna-Barbera for breach of contract but lost. 

George O'Hanlon, was hired after auditioning but failing to win the role of Fred Flintstone two years prior, became George Jetson's voice actor, a role he would retain for the rest of his life through both the sixties and eighties versions of the cartoon series. O'Hanlon last did the voice for George Jetson in Jetsons: The Movie, which was released posthumously.

The current voice of George Jetson is Jeff Bergman, who voiced George (and also Mr. Spacely) in some parts of the movie after O'Hanlon's death, and also voiced George in The Funtastic World of Hanna-Barbera as well as for the cameo in the Harvey Birdman, Attorney at Law episode "Shaggy Busted" and Spümcø's two Jetsons cartoons: Father & Son Day and The Best Son.

In the Harvey Birdman, Attorney at Law episode "Back to the Present", George was voiced by Wally Wingert. In the episode, the Jetsons return to the past to sue the planet for causing global warming.

Media

Television series
 The Jetsons

Films and specials
 The Jetsons Meet the Flintstones: a 1987 made-for-TV movie for syndication
 Rockin' with Judy Jetson: a 1988 made-for-TV movie for syndication
 A Yabba Dabba Doo Celebration: 50 Years of Hanna-Barbera: a 1989 TV special celebrating 50 years of Hanna-Barbera Productions
 Jetsons: The Movie: a 1990 animated feature released by Universal Pictures
 The Jetsons & WWE: Robo-WrestleMania!: a 2017 direct-to-video movie released by Warner Home Video
 Space Jam: A New Legacy a 2021 animated feature released by Warner Bros. Pictures

Other appearances
George Jetson also appears at the Cedar Fair Entertainment Company and formerly Universal Studios Florida as a meetable character (until c.2002, when the Funtastic World of Hanna-Barbera was closed) seen in 1996 video called "Kids for Character".
George Jetson also appeared in a brief, silent cameo in an episode of Fantastic Max, alongside Space Ghost & The Great Gazoo.
George Jetson, along with his family, Rosie and Mr. Spacely can be seen in a MetLife commercial in 2012.
George Jetson appeared in a vintage 1960s Mister Softee commercial as a father.
George Jetson appeared in The Flintstones: The Rescue of Dino & Hoppy video game in 1991.
George Jetson also made a few cameo appearances on episodes of Family Guy, The Powerpuff Girls, Dexter's Laboratory, and Animaniacs.
George Jetson makes a cameo appearance in Space Jam: A New Legacy alongside his family, Astro, Rosie, and several other Hanna-Barbera and Warner Bros. characters.

References

Television characters introduced in 1962
The Jetsons
Animated human characters
Hanna-Barbera characters
Male characters in animation
Fictional people from the 21st-century